Gunsmoke: To the Last Man is a 1992 American Western television film starring James Arness as retired Marshal Matt Dillon. It was directed by Jerry Jameson and based upon the long-running American TV series Gunsmoke (1955 to 1975).

Plot
The film is set in Arizona, sometime after events of the prior TV movie, Gunsmoke: The Last Apache, which included the surrender of Apache Chief Geronimo on September 4, 1886. This places it in the latter half of the Pleasant Valley War (1882–1892), a family feud between the Tewksbury and Graham clans, which also involved vigilante ranchers, cowboys, sheepmen, gunmen, lawmen, and innocent civilians, and that ultimately killed scores of people over a 10-year span.

Matt is now a cattle rancher in the Dragoon Mountains northeast of Tombstone along with his daughter Beth (Amy Stock-Poynton), whose mother "Mike" has just died (from season 19, episode three, wherein Michael Learned portrayed a widowed rancher named Mike Yardner). After the funeral, Matt has an altercation with the villainous Tommy Graham (Joseph Bottoms). Having been beaten down, Tommy murders Charlie Tewksbury (Ken Swofford) and rustles Matt's cattle for revenge.

Against her protests, Matt puts Beth on the train to Philadelphia to respect Mike's wish for her to complete a college education. Matt then tracks Tommy Graham's band north towards the Tonto Basin, the area south of Payson, Arizona, where the Pleasant Valley War had its origin.

Along the way, Matt encounters an old acquaintance, Colonel Tucker (Pat Hingle). Unbeknownst to Matt, Tucker is now the leader of a vigilante faction called the Committee of 50, which carries out lynchings of suspected cattle rustlers and other undesirables. Matt cuts three such innocent victims down from a tree, and hauls them to Payson to report the murders to Sheriff Abel Rose (Morgan Woodward).

Meanwhile, Beth gets off the train and heads out to find Matt. Ranch hand Will McCall (Matt Mulhern) and she then get caught up in the range war.

Cast

 James Arness as Matt Dillon
 Pat Hingle	as Col. Tucker
 Amy Stock-Poynton as Beth Dillon
 Matt Mulhern as Will McCall
 Jason Lively as Rusty Dover
 Joseph Bottoms as Tommy Graham
 Morgan Woodward as Sheriff Abel Rose
Co-starring:
 Mills Watson as The Horse Trader
 James Booth as Zack the Preacher
 Amanda Wyss as Lizzie Tewksbury
 Jim Beaver as Deputy Willie Rudd
 Herman Poppe as John Tewksbury
 Ken Swofford as Charlie Teksbury
Additional cast:
 Don Collier as Sheriff Joe (Tombstone)
 Ed Adams as Billy Wilson
 Kathleen Todd Erickson as Mrs. Claire Oliver
 Loy W. Burns as Kirby Tewksbury
 Andy Sherman as Virgil Tucker
 Clark A. Ray as Rowe Blevin
 Michael F. Woodson as Bartender (Payson House)
 Erol Landis as Cole Tucker
 William J. Fisher as Undertaker
 Stephen C. Foster as Luther
 Rick San Nicholas as Tink
 Jimmy Don Cox as Onlooker
 Richard Glover as David Henry

Reception
The film won its time slot with a 14.2/24 rating/share and ranked 28th out of 93 programs airing that week.

References

External links
 
 Gunsmoke: To the Last Man at INSP.com

1992 television films
1992 films
1992 Western (genre) films
1990s American films
1990s English-language films
American Western (genre) television films
American sequel films
CBS network films
Films directed by Jerry Jameson
Films scored by Artie Kane
Gunsmoke
Television sequel films
Television series reunion films